Sweet Venus is the Primitive Radio Gods' fourth album, released independently through their official site as a full-album download on May 4, 2006. Sweet Venus continues the shoegaze-influenced alternative rock the band started with their previous effort, Still Electric.

The name was inspired by Homer Simpson's gurgling utterance as he peeled a gummy off the babysitter's backside.

The song "Things You Can Drive" was #1 in the Tomatrax Top 100 of 2006.

Track listing
 "Planet 10" (3:14)
 "Things You Can Drive" (3:13)
 "Post Telecom Daydream" (2:38)
 "Station to Life" (3:54)
 "Inside" (3:34)
 "Automatic" (4:34)
 "Smoke to the Boss" (2:49)
 "Empty Bars Protect Us" (2:48)
 "Stars Align" (3:34)

2016 Edition
In 2016, the track listing was changed. ("Sighs and Light" is a reworking of "Inside".)
 "Planet 10" (3:14)
 "Smoke to the Boss" (2:49)
 "Post Telecom Daydream" (2:38)
 "Sighs and Light" (3:34)
 "Things You Can Drive" (3:13)
 "Stars Align" (3:34)
 "Automatic" (4:34)
 "Station to Life" (3:54)
 "Empty Bars Protect Us" (2:48)

References

Primitive Radio Gods albums
2006 albums